Bill Gerrand (23 December 1916 – 21 July 2000) was an Australian rules footballer who played with North Melbourne in the Victorian Football League (VFL).

Notes

External links 

1916 births
2000 deaths
Australian rules footballers from Victoria (Australia)
North Melbourne Football Club players